Stimulation Festival is a studio album by American band Pain Teens, released in 1992 by Trance Syndicate. "Wild World" is a cover of the Birthday Party song.

Reception

The Chicago Tribune deemed the album "a 14-track dread- and chaos-permeated industrial slugfest, built around singer Bliss Blood's drained, spoken-word ramblings and Scott Ayers' guitar hash and mechanistic studio manipulations." The Dallas Morning News praised the "inventive guitar and samples [and] Ms. Blood's sassy singing."

Jason Anderson of AllMusic called the album "a fine first purchase for new fans, as it is nothing if not representative of Pain Teens' sonic assault."

Track listing

Personnel
Adapted from the Stimulation Festival liner notes.

Pain Teens
 Scott Ayers – guitar, drums, electronics, tape, production, engineering
 Bliss Blood – lead vocals, cover art
 Kirk Carr – bass guitar
 Frank Garymartin – drums
 David Parker – drums

Release history

References

External links 
 Stimulation Festival at Bandcamp
 

Pain Teens albums
1992 albums
Albums produced by Scott Ayers
Trance Syndicate albums